Morecambe and Lonsdale was a constituency of the British House of Commons which existed until 1983.

Following the reorganisation of local government in England in the 1970s, a successor constituency called Morecambe and Lunesdale was formed. This followed the formation of Cumbria as a county council.

Before 1950, Morecambe was in the Lancaster constituency.

Boundaries

In the 1950s, the seat of Morecambe and Lonsdale incorporated Morecambe, Heysham, Carnforth, and the communities with Ulverston Rural District, which included Grange-over-Sands, Ulverston, Pennington, Satterthwaite, Hawkshead and Coniston

Members of Parliament

Results

Elections in the 1950s

Elections in the 1960s

Elections in the 1970s

References

Parliamentary constituencies in North West England (historic)
Constituencies of the Parliament of the United Kingdom established in 1950
Politics of Lancaster
Constituencies of the Parliament of the United Kingdom disestablished in 1983